The Lamniformes (from Greek lamna "fish of prey") are an order of sharks commonly known as mackerel sharks (which may also refer specifically to the family Lamnidae). It includes some of the most familiar species of sharks, such as the great white, as well as more unusual representatives, such as the goblin shark and megamouth shark.

Members of the order are distinguished by possessing two dorsal fins, an anal fin, five gill slits, eyes without nictitating membranes, and a mouth extending behind the eyes. Species in two families of Lamniformes – Lamnidae and Alopiidae – are distinguished for maintaining a higher body temperature than the surrounding waters.

Members of the group include macropredators, generally of medium-large size, including the largest macropredatory shark ever, the extinct Otodus megalodon, as well as large planktivores.

The oldest member of the group is the small (~ long) carpet shark-like Palaeocarcharias, known from the Middle and Late Jurassic, which shares the distinctive tooth histology of most lamniform sharks, which lack orthodentine. Lamniformes underwent a major adaptive radiation during the Cretaceous and became prominent elements of oceanic ecosystems. They reached their highest diversity during the Late Cretaceous, but severely declined during the K-Pg extinction, before rebounding to a high but lower diversity peak during the Paleogene. Lamniformes have severely declined over the last 20 million years, with only 15 species alive today, compared to over 290 extant species in the Carcharhiniformes, which have evolved into medium and large body sizes during the same timeframe. The causes of the decline are uncertain, but are likely to have involved both biotic factors like competition and non-biotic factors like temperature and sea level.

Species
The order Lamniformes includes 10 families with 22 species, with a total of seven living families and 17 living species:

Order Lamniformes
 Family Alopiidae Bonaparte, 1838 (thresher sharks)
 Genus Alopias Rafinesque, 1810
 Alopias pelagicus Nakamura, 1935 (pelagic thresher) 
 Alopias superciliosus R. T. Lowe, 1841 (bigeye thresher) 
 Alopias vulpinus (Bonnaterre, 1788) (common thresher) 
 Family †Anacoracidae Capetta, 1987 (extinct, Cretaceous period)
 Genus †Squalicorax (crow sharks)
 Genus †Telodontaspis
 Genus †Pseudocorax
 Genus †Galeocorax
 Genus †Scindocorax
 Genus †Nanocorax
 Genus †Ptychocorax
Family †Aquilolamnidae Vullo et al., 2021? (eagle sharks) (extinct, Late Cretaceous period)
Genus †Aquilolamna Vullo et al., 2021
†Aquilolamna milarcae Vullo et al., 2021
 Family Cetorhinidae Gill, 1862
 Genus Cetorhinus Blainville, 1816
 Cetorhinus maximus (Gunnerus, 1765) (basking shark) 
†Cetorhinus huddlestoni (Welton, 2014)
†Cetorhinus piersoni (Welton, 2015)
 Genus †Keasius (Welton, 2013)
Family Eoptolamnidae (extinct, Late Cretaceous period)
Genus †Eoptolamna
†Eoptolamna eccentrolopha
 Genus †Leptostyrax
†Leptostyrax macrorhiza
 Genus †Protolamna
†Protolamna sokolovi
†Protolamna borodini
†Protolamna carteri
†Protolamna compressidens
†Protolamna gigantea
†Protolamna roanokeensis
 Superfamily Lamnoidea Bonaparte, 1835
 Family Lamnidae J. P. Müller and Henle, 1838 (mackerel sharks or white sharks)
 Genus Carcharodon A. Smith, 1838
 Carcharodon carcharias (Linnaeus, 1758) (great white shark) 
 †Carcharodon hubbelli Ehret, Macfadden, Jones, Devries, Foster & Salas-Gismondi, 2012 (Hubbell's white shark)
 †Carcharodon caifassii Lawley, 1876
 Genus Isurus Rafinesque, 1810
 Isurus oxyrinchus Rafinesque, 1810 (shortfin mako) 
 Isurus paucus Guitart-Manday, 1966 (longfin mako) 
 Genus Lamna Cuvier, 1816
 Lamna ditropis Hubbs & Follett, 1947 (salmon shark) 
 Lamna nasus (Bonnaterre, 1788) (porbeagle) 
 Family †Otodontidae Gluckman, 1964 (extinct, Late Cretaceous to Pliocene) (megatoothed sharks)
 Genus †Cretalamna Gluckman, 1958
 Genus †Otodus (=Carcharocles) (Agassiz, 1843)
 †Otodus obliquus (Agassiz, 1838)
 †Otodus angustidens (Agassiz, 1843)
 †Otodus chubutensis (Agassiz, 1843)
 †Otodus megalodon (Agassiz, 1843) (megalodon)
 †Otodus auriculatus (Jordan, 1923)
 †Otodus sokolovi (Zhelezko and Kozlov, 1999)
 Genus †Megalolamna Shimada et al., 2016
 Genus †Palaeocarcharodon Casieer, 1960
 Genus †Kenolamna Siversson, 2017
 Family Megachasmidae Taylor, Compagno & Struhsaker, 1983
 Genus Megachasma Taylor, Compagno & Struhsaker, 1983
 Megachasma pelagios Taylor, Compagno & Struhsaker, 1983 (megamouth shark) 
 Family Mitsukurinidae D. S. Jordan, 1898
 Genus Mitsukurina D. S. Jordan, 1898
 Mitsukurina owstoni D. S. Jordan, 1898 (goblin shark) 
 Family Odontaspididae Müller & Henle, 1839
 Genus Carcharias Rafinesque, 1810
 Carcharias taurus Rafinesque, 1810 (sand tiger shark) 
 Genus Odontaspis Agassiz, 1838
 Odontaspis ferox (Risso, 1810) (smalltooth sand tiger) 
 Odontaspis noronhai (Maul, 1955) (bigeye sand tiger) 
 Family Pseudocarchariidae Compagno, 1973
 Genus Pseudocarcharias Cadenat, 1963
 Pseudocarcharias kamoharai (Matsubara, 1936) (crocodile shark) 
 Family †Cardabiodontidae (extinct, Late Cretaceous period)
 Genus †Cardabiodon Siverson, 1999
 †Cardabiodon ricki Siverson, 1999 
 †Cardabiodon venator Siverson and Lindgren, 2005 
 Genus †Dwardius Siverson, 1999
 Genus †Parotodus? Cappetta, 1980
 Family †Cretoxyrhinidae (extinct, Late Cretaceous period)
 Genus †Cretoxyrhina Agassiz, 1843
 †Cretoxyrhina vraconensis Zhelezko, 2000 
 †Cretoxyrhina denticulata Glückman, 1957 
 †Cretoxyrhina agassizensis Underwood and Cumbaa, 2010 
 †Cretoxyrhina mantelli Agassiz, 1843 (ginsu shark) 
Family †Serratolamnidae
Genus †Serratolamna

Sustainable consumption
In 2010, Greenpeace International added the shortfin mako shark (Isurus oxyrinchus) to its seafood red list.

References

Further reading
 Compagno, Leonard (2002) Sharks of the World: Bullhead, mackerel and carpet sharks Volume 2, FAO Species Catalogue, Rome. .

External links

 elasmo-research

 
Extant Early Cretaceous first appearances
Cartilaginous fish orders
Taxa named by Lev Berg